Giovanni di Lorenzo Larciani (1484 - 1527) was an Italian painter. He was originally referred to as the Maestro dei paesaggi Kress (Master of the Kress landscapes).

Work & attribution 
His original name referred to a body of works at the National Gallery of Art that form part of the Kress Collection. While studying that work, Louis Alexander Waldman discovered documents, including a contract from 1521, that linked it with someone named Giovanni Larciani, whose biography and oeuvre the same scholar has reconstructed in a series of publications.

He may also have painted Portrait of a Young Woman, also previously attributed as a very early Rosso work.

He has since been credited with a Madonna and Child at the Galerie Hans in Hamburg and a Holy Family with St.John at the Galleria Borghese.

Sources
 Federico Zeri: "Eccentrici fiorentini - Il pittore dei Paesaggi Kress". In: Bolletino d'Arte, 47, 1 (1962) pg. 227. 
 L. A. Waldman: The 'Master of the Kress Landscapes' Unmasked: Giovanni Larciani and the Fucecchio Altar-piece". In: The Burlington Magazine, 140, 1998, pgs. 456–469.
 Antonio Natali, Rosso Fiorentino, Silvana Editore, Milano 2006.

External links

 Scenes from a Legend (1), ca. 1515/1520, Washington, National Gallery of Art  Inv. Nr.1939.1.344.a
 Scenes from a Legend (2), ca. 1515/1520, Washington, National Gallery of Art  Inv. Nr.1939.1.344.b
 Scenes from a Legend (3), ca. 1515/1520, Washington, National Gallery of Art  Inv. Nr.1939.1.344.c

1484 births
1527 deaths
Italian painters
Italian Renaissance painters